Limestone County is a county of the U.S. state of Alabama. As of the 2020 census, the county's population was 103,570. Its county seat is Athens. The county is named after Limestone Creek. Limestone County is included in the Huntsville, AL Metropolitan Statistical Area.

History

Limestone County was established by the Alabama Territorial legislature on February 6, 1818. On November 27, 1821, the Alabama State legislature passed an Act that altered the boundary of Limestone County to include the area east of the mouth of the Elk River with the Tennessee River. At the time, that area was a part of Lauderdale County.

Geography
It is the third smallest county in Alabama by land area.

River
Tennessee River
Elk River

Adjacent counties
Giles County, Tennessee - north
Lincoln County, Tennessee - northeast
Madison County, Alabama - east
Morgan County, Alabama - southeast
Lawrence County, Alabama - southwest
Lauderdale County, Alabama - west

National protected area
 Wheeler National Wildlife Refuge (part)

Demographics

2000 census
As of the 2000 census, there were 65,676 people, 24,688 households, and 18,219 families living in the county. The population density was 45/km2 (116/sq mi). There were 26,897 housing units at an average density of 18/km2 (47/sq ;mi). The racial makeup of the county was 78.79% White, 15.33% Black or African American, 0.46% Native American, 0.35% Asian, 0.02% Pacific Islander, 1.14% from other races, and 0.91% from two or more races. 2.65% of the population were Hispanic or Latino of any race.

According to the census of 2000, the largest ancestry groups in Limestone County were English 66.31%, Scots-Irish 15.12%, and African 13.33%

There were 24,688 households, 34.80% had children under the age of 18 living with them, 60.00% were married couples living together, 10.40% had a female householder with no husband present, and 26.20% were non-families. 23.40% of households were one person and 8.90% were one person aged 65 or older. The average household size was 2.55 and the average family size was 3.02.

The age distribution was 24.90% under the age of 18, 8.80% from 18 to 24, 32.10% from 25 to 44, 23.10% from 45 to 64, and 11.10% 65 or older. The median age was 36 years. For every 100 females, there were 103.10 males. For every 100 females age 18 and over, there were 101.80 males.

The median household income in the county was $37,405, and the median family income was $45,146. Males had a median income of $35,743 versus $23,389 for females. The per capita income for the county was $17,782. About 9.80% of families and 12.30% of the population were below the poverty line, including 16.20% of those under age 18 and 14.60% of those age 65 or over.

2010 census
As of the 2010 census, there were 82,782 people, 31,446 households, and 22,876 families living in the county. The population density was 57.1/km2 (147.8/sq mi). There were 34,977 housing units at an average density of 24.1/km2 (62.5/sq mi). The racial makeup of the county was 80.3% White, 12.6% Black or African American, 0.7% Native American, 1.1% Asian, 0.1% Pacific Islander, 3.5% from other races, and 1.8% from two or more races. 5.5% of the population were Hispanic or Latino of any race.

There were 31,446 households, 31.4% had children under the age of 18 living with them, 57.0% were married couples living together, 11.4% had a female householder with no husband present, and 27.3% were non-families. 23.7% of households were one person and 8.5% were one person aged 65 or older. The average household size was 2.54 and the average family size was 3.00.

The age distribution was 24.0% under the age of 18, 8.0% from 18 to 24, 28.1% from 25 to 44, 27.6% from 45 to 64, and 12.3% 65 or older. The median age was 38.4 years. For every 100 females, there were 102.5 males. For every 100 females age 18 and over, there were 107.0 males.

The median household income in the county was $46,682, and the median family income was $55,518. Males had a median income of $46,071 versus $31,609 for females. The per capita income for the county was $24,007. About 10.3% of families and 13.5% of the population were below the poverty line, including 17.5% of those under age 18 and 11.0% of those age 65 or over.

2020 census

As of the 2020 United States census, there were 103,570 people, 32,020 households, and 23,919 families residing in the county.

Government and politics
Limestone County comprises the Thirty-Ninth Judicial Circuit of Alabama. The Thirty-Ninth Judicial Circuit was created in the early 1980s when Limestone County broke away from Morgan County to form its own circuit.

The Thirty-Ninth Judicial Circuit has two circuit judges and two district judges. The two circuit judges are Judge Robert M. Baker and Judge B. Chadwick Wise. The two district judges are Judge Matthew R. Huggins and Judge R. Gray West.

The current District Attorney is Brian C.T. Jones.

The current Sheriff of Limestone County is Joshua McLaughlin. The term for sheriffs is four years, and there is no term limit.

Collin Daly (R) is the Chairman of the County Commission.

Limestone County is reliably Republican at the presidential level. The last Democrat to win the county in a presidential election is Jimmy Carter, who won it by an absolute majority in 1980.

Education

School districts include:
 Limestone County School District operates public schools for students living in most areas of Limestone County not incorporated in the Cities of Athens, Decatur, Huntsville, and/or Madison.
 Athens City Schools - K-12 education for the city of Athens
 Decatur City School District
 Huntsville City School District
 Madison City School District

Tertiary education:
Calhoun Community College - 2-year college located in the southern part of the county in Decatur
Athens State University - 2-year upper level university located in Athens

Transportations

Major highways
 Interstate 65
 Interstate 565
 U.S. Highway 31
 U.S. Highway 72
 Alternate U.S. Highway 72/State Route 20
 State Route 53
 State Route 99
 State Route 127
 State Route 251

Railways
CSX Transportation—freight line that runs North to South
Norfolk Southern Railway—freight line that runs east–west

Airport
Huntsville International Airport (HSV) is the nearest major commercial airport, 23 miles east.
 Nashville Airport (BNA) is approximately 104 miles north.

Recreation
 Cowford Campground – riverside campground with 48 campsites with full hookups. Next to Cowford Landing.
 Cowford Landing – swimming, fishing, and boating. Next to Cowford Campground.
 Limestone County Canoe and Kayak Trail – a  along the Elk River for canoeing with five access sites. Designated a National Recreation Trail in 2010.
 Richard Martin Trail – a  rail trail in northern part of the county for bicycling, horseback riding, and walking. Designated a National Recreation Trail in 2010.
Antebellum Trail – a trail rich in the Antebellum period architecture that highlights Athens, Belle Mina and Mooresville. 
 Ardmore Walking Tracks – One  walking track is located in Ardmore Town Park on Park Avenue. The other  track is locating in Ardmore's John Barns Park on Ardmore Ridge Road
 Athens Greenway Walking Trail – This  walking trail starts at the Athens SportsPlex goes by Athens High School and Athens Public Archery Range and continues to U.S. Highway 72 for an additional 
Athens Historic Volksmarch – An American Volksport Association (AVA) sanctioned 10K (6.2 miles) walk.
Beaty Historic District Walking Tour "Step Back In Time" – walking tour of the Robert Beaty Historic District which was placed on the Registry of Historic Places in 1984.
Civil War Trail – Driving/walking trail highlighting the history of the Civil War in the greater Limestone County community.
The Glory Road – Driving tour of historic and community churches of Limestone County

GOLFING
 Canebrake Club – membership
 Southern Gayles Golf Club – community

FISHING
Limestone County Alabama offers access to the prime fishing waters of the Elk River, Tennessee River and Wheeler Lake.

HUNTING
 Limestone Hunting Preserve & Sporting Clays offers deer, dove, quail, pheasant and chukar hunts and sporting clays.
 Piney Creek Kennels and Hunting Preserve offers 100+ acres of dove and quail hunting land.
 Swan Creek WMA – 8,870 acres of Alabama Department of Conservation managed area and includes a shooting range
 Tennessee Valley Federal Property – 11,300 acres of regulated hunting land

FESTIVALS
 February
 Hospice Chili Challenge – last weekend
 March
Polk Sallet Follies – second week, Thursday-Saturday
Home and Garden Show – second weekend
April
Athens Cruise In (April–September)
Saturday Historic Walking Tours – Athens & Mooresville – each Saturday
Cars and Bikes on the Square – last Saturday
Singing on the Square (April–September) – third Fridays
Earth Day Celebration – third Saturday
May
Athens-Limestone Relay for Life
Limestone Sheriff's Rodeo 
Athens Bible School Homespun Arts and Crafts Show
June
Athens Lions Club Kiddie Carnival (last weekend in June to first weekend August)
July
Limestone County Week of Independence (last Saturday of June to first Saturday of July)
Firework Show 
Ardmore Lions Club Tractor and Truck Pull – second weekend
CASA Mud Volleyball Tournament – third Saturday
Alabama Championship Tractor and Truck Pull – Tanner – last weekend
August
Ardmore Crape Myrtle Festival
Ardmore Police Reserve Rodeo
Piney Chapel American Farm Heritage Days
September
Athens Grease Festival
October
Tennessee Valley Old Time Fiddlers Convention – first full weekend
Wacky Quacky Ducky Derby – first full weekend
Athens Storytelling Festival – last weekend
November
Hilltop Arts Festival
Athens Christmas Open House
December
Athens Christmas Parade
Limestone County Tree Lighting (same night as Athens Parade)
Ardmore Christmas Parade
Elkmont Lions Club Christmas Parade
Sippin' Cider
Lincoln Bridgeforth Park Tree Lighting

Points of interest

MUSEUMS
 Alabama Veterans Museum and Archives - honoring veterans and their families with displays of memorabilia from the Revolutionary War to the present.
 College Inn/Newby Gulf Station Museum - This landmark was restored to look like a 1940s gas station. It has been featured in Southern Living photo spreads.
 Donnell House - This historic landmark is the former home of Reverend Donnell and a significant site for the "Sack of Athens"
 Houston Memorial Library and Museum - The cornerstone of the Houston Historic District, the building now houses a library and the county museum.
 Limestone County Archives - Contains community and genealogical records for Limestone County.

POINTS OF INTEREST
 Alabama Welcome Center - Just south of the Alabama/Tennessee border, this facility is home to a Saturn 1B rocket as well as war memorials for World War II, Korea and Vietnam.
 Athens State University - A significant site for the "Sack of Athens". Founders Hall is the original structure of the university and is graced with 4 large pillars. Founders Hall also houses the New Testament Chapel containing life-size carvings depicting Christ and other New Testament figures.
 Trinity School - Established by the American Missionary Association to educate the children of freed slaves.
 Limestone County Confederate Soldiers Memorial

Communities

Cities
 Athens (county seat)
 Decatur (mostly in Morgan County)
 Huntsville (mostly in Madison County)
 Madison (mostly in Madison County)

Towns
 Ardmore 
 Elkmont 
 Lester 
 Mooresville

Unincorporated communities

 Belle Mina
 Capshaw
 Coxey
 Good Springs
 Greenbrier
 Holland Gin
 Oakland (near Athens)
 Oakland (near Madison)
 Pettusville
 Scarce Grease
 Tanner
 Thach
 Veto

See also
National Register of Historic Places listings in Limestone County, Alabama
Properties on the Alabama Register of Landmarks and Heritage in Limestone County, Alabama

References

External links

University of Alabama's Cartographic Research Laboratory Historic Aerial Photos Collection for Athens and Limestone County
University of Alabama's Cartographic Research Laboratory Historic Map Collection for Athens and Limestone County

 
1818 establishments in Alabama Territory
Populated places established in 1818
Huntsville-Decatur, AL Combined Statistical Area
Counties of Appalachia